José Benigno Samanez y Ocampo (March 19, 1838 - November 14, 1887) navigated the rivers Apurimac, Ene, Tambo, Urubamba and Ucayali between 1883 and 1884, searching for the best way between the Pacific and Atlantic Ocean. Born in Andahuaylas in 1838, he was father of David Samanez Ocampo, president of the transitional government of Perú of 1931. He died in Iquitos in 1887 at the age of 49 of yellow fever while being the city prefect.

References
Samanez, Consuelo (1980). "Exploración de los Rios Peruanos Apurimac, Eni, Tambo, Ucayali Y Urubamba."
 Library of Congress. "Exploración de los Rios Peruanos Apurimac, Eni, Tambo, Ucayali y Urubamba."
 The University of Arizona Library. "Exploración de los Rios Peruanos Apurimac, Eni, Tambo, Ucayali y Urubamba."
 University of California, Berkeley. "Exploración de los Rios Peruanos Apurimac, Eni, Tambo, Ucayali y Urubamba."
 Universidad Catolica del Peru. "Exploración de los Rios Peruanos Apurimac, Eni, Tambo, Ucayali y Urubamba."

1838 births
1887 deaths
Deaths from yellow fever
Peruvian explorers of the Pacific
Peruvian explorers
Infectious disease deaths in Peru